Pietro Arduino (18 July 1728, in Caprino Veronese – 13 April 1805, in Padua) was an Italian botanist. 

The geologist Giovanni Arduino (1714–1795) was his brother, and the agriculturalist Luigi Arduino (1750–1833) was his son.

Selected works 
 
 
 Memorie di osservazioni e di sperienze sopra la cultura e gli usi di varie plante, 1766.

Sources 

 Fritz Encke, Günther Buchheim, Siegmund Seybold, eds. Zander Handwörterbuch der Pflanzennamen; 13th ed. Ulmer Verlag, Stuttgart, 1984 

18th-century Italian botanists
1728 births
1805 deaths